Vary is a village in Zakarpattia Oblast (province) of western Ukraine. Administratively, the village belongs to the Berehove Raion, Zakarpattia Oblast. Historically, the name originates from the Hungarian word vár meaning castle. The village was first mentioned as Vári in 1320 and was previously known as Borsovavára.

Population
In 1921, the village had a population of 2,625, mostly Hungarians. , the population includes 3,302 inhabitants, of which 3008 are Hungarians.

References 

Villages in Berehove Raion